Maria Lopez is a judge.

Maria Lopez may also refer to:

Sportspeople
María López, Spanish field hockey goalkeeper
Maria Lopez (swimmer), represented Bolivia at the 2010 Summer Youth Olympics
María López Nery, represented Paraguay at the 2013 World Aquatics Championships
María López (basketball) represented Paraguay in 1953 FIBA World Championship for Women
María López (field hockey), Peruvian player in 2014–15 Women's FIH Hockey World League Round 1
María López García, played for Spain women's national field hockey team
María López (footballer), represented Dominican Republic in 2016 CONCACAF Women's U-17 Championship qualification
María López Coton, represented Argentina at the 2011 Pan American Games

Other uses
María Ygnacia López de Carrillo, Californio ranchera
Maria Isabel Lopez, Filipina movie and television actress
Maria Chapa Lopez, American attorney
María López Morante, actress in Malvaloca (1942 film)
Maria Lopez Pacheco, see Juan López Pacheco, Duke of Escalona
María López Mares, see LVIII Legislature of the Mexican Congress
María López Urbina, see Mireille Roccatti

Fictional characters
Maria Lopez, fictional character in Saved by the Bell: The New Class
Maria Lopez (Passions character)

See also
Judge Maria Lopez, TV show